Cci colony Kurkunta is a village in Gulbarga district's Sedam taluk, Karnataka India. A government run cement factory is located here: Cement Corporation of India (CCI).

References

Villages in Kalaburagi district